Kielvale is a town located in north-eastern New South Wales, Australia, in the Tweed Shire.

Demographics

The median age of the Kielvale population was 45 years, 8 years above the national median of 37.

85% of people living in Kielvale were born in Australia. The other top responses for country of birth were England 2.8%, Italy 1.2%, Colombia 0.9%, China 0.9%, Belgium 0.9%.

92% of people spoke only English at home; the next most common languages were 2.1% Spanish, 1.5% Italian, 0.9% Russian,

References 

Suburbs of Tweed Heads, New South Wales